WBOK (1230 AM) is a radio station, that has historically broadcast a variety of formats, including Gospel and various local talk programs brokered by their hosts. Licensed within New Orleans, Louisiana, of the United States, this station has historically served the New Orleans area, by its contributions to the promotion and preservation of African American culture and history.  This radio station regularly features programming and events that highlight the contributions and experiences of black individuals within the mixed culture of communities, that makes New Orleans the Gumbo, while this seems to be a significant contribution to the celebration and education of black history. This radio station has a long history of serving the African American community and providing a platform for important discussions and a wide variety of perspectives. The station is currently owned by the Equity Media LLC., which is a team composed of New Orleans native and actor/producer Wendell Pierce; Cleveland Spears III, president and CEO of the Spears Group;, Troy Henry, managing partner of Henry Consulting; and  Jeff Thomas, founder of Thomas Media Services. Its current slogan is "Real Talk for Real Times".

History
AM 1230 was originally WJBW with a Top 40 format in the late 1950s, but by the end of the decade it switched call letters to WSHO and became a Broadway music formatted outlet. In 1962 WBOK swapped signals with WSHO and moved its R&B format to the 1230 signal. The R&B format would last until the late 1970s when it evolved to its current format after it was sold to Bishop Levi Willis.

The failure of levees immediately following the landfall of Hurricane Katrina on August 29, 2005 resulted in flooding of WBOK's studio and offices.  The station's transmitter site also received flood damage and the broadcast tower was severely damaged.

WBOK returned to the air as of November 3, 2007 with an urban music and talk format, the station would work as an outlet for black political leaders to voice their opinion on matters because they felt as though the other outlets were supporting whites only.

WBOK was owned since April 2007 by the Bakewell Media Company. Its principals, Danny Bakewell Sr. and Danny Bakewell Jr. are native New Orleanians who reside and operate a number of businesses in Los Angeles, California, including being owners of the Los Angeles Sentinel. “The new broadcast outlet offers a window into the rapidly changing African American political consciousness in post-Katrina New Orleans. The new format, “Talk Back: Talk Black” marks a significant development in African American political life post-Katrina. Bakewell's comments on today's broadcast made it clear that his goal is to make WBOK a voice for African Americans in New Orleans and the Diaspora.

“WBOK listeners will hear elements of a political discourse that is emerging in the post-Katrina black community—marked by trenchant critique of racism in the recovery, a relentless attack on the current governing black political class, and a forthright discussion of destructive behaviors that are undermining black community regeneration. With virtually all the New Orleans electronic media controlled by white elites, one can expect WBOK to become an important forum for a black dialogue and alternative perspectives on race, class, and the recovery. Whether or not the “Talk Back Talk Black” radio format can find advertisers to ensure economic viability remains to be seen, especially given the decimation of the New Orleans black middle class and black businesses. But Bakewell seems to be guided by more a sense of justice than a desire for profit,” writes Lance Hill. Ph.D., Executive Director of the Southern Institute for Education and Research at Tulane University.

Effective January 2, 2020, Bakewell Media sold WBOK to Equity Media LLC for $550,000.

References

External links
FCC History Cards for WBOK

WBOK
Radio stations established in 1962